Rum Creek is a stream in the U.S. state of West Virginia.

Rum Creek was named for an incident when a barrel of rum spilled in its waters.

See also
List of rivers of West Virginia

References

Rivers of Logan County, West Virginia
Rivers of West Virginia